J. M. Hanks High School, commonly referred to as Hanks High School, is one of seven public secondary schools in Ysleta Independent School District, which encompasses much of east El Paso, Texas. Hanks' primary feeder school is J.M. Hanks Middle School.  Additionally, many students from nearby Eastwood Middle School go on to attend Hanks High School.

History
J.M. Hanks High School is named in honor of former Ysleta superintendent Jesse Mack Hanks, who retained the position for a full fifty years from approximately 1939 until his death in 1989. For his extended service to the district, Hanks was awarded an honorary Doctor of Laws from New Mexico State University in nearby Las Cruces, New Mexico in 1965 and was named superintendent emeritus by Ysleta.

The school was opened in 1978 to accommodate El Paso's eastward expansion and to ease overcrowding at nearby Eastwood High School, which lies 2.5 miles to the west of Hanks. The school initially enrolled seventh, eighth and ninth graders comprising the classes that would graduate in 1982, 1983 and 1984.  The class of 1985 was added for the 1979–80 school year as those students became seventh-graders.  As those four classes "moved up" each year, the student body thus remained virtually intact until Hanks reached standard high school set of grades 9-12 for the 1981–82 school year.  Hanks' enrollment had reached 1,800 by 1980, with the inaugural class graduating 372 students in May 1982.

Student publications
Hanks High School has four student-run publications, each produced in a different media. The Exeter is an annual magazine that is filled with student-submitted content including poems, short stories, and drawings, all based around the year's chosen theme. Scriptoria is the monthly news and features magazine (formerly a newspaper) that consists of current events ranging in scope from the small-scale school news to world news, as well as movie reviews, restaurant reviews, and editorials. It also manages [www.hanksmedia.com]. Hanks' yearbook is entitled The Shield and the theme of the book is chosen by the student staff at the beginning of each year. The Shield has won national awards in the past for its originality. Starting in 2003 the Shield Yearbook also started producing a DVD that highlights the year's events. KnightVision News is the student-run daily 10-minute closed-circuit television broadcast, and consists of school announcements, news, weather, sports and special features. It is produced by students in the Advanced Broadcast Journalism class.

Athletics and athletic coaches
Baseball
Boys Basketball
Boys Soccer
Boys Track
Boys Wrestling
Cheerleading
Football
Girls Basketball
Girls Soccer
Girls Track
Golf
Softball
Swimming
Volleyball
Tennis

Clubs and organizations
AVID
Academic Decathlon
Art Club
Band & Flags- Silver Knights Marching Band
Business Professionals of America
Chess
Choir
Citizen Bee
Close Up
Crime Stoppers
DECA
Destination Imagination
Drama
Eco Club
Exeter
Future Business Leaders of America
Future Career Consumer Leaders of America
Future Homemakers of America
Guitar Club
Home Economics Related Occupations
High Q
Interact
Intramurals
Knight Force
Knight Players
KnightVision News
Knights for Christ
Mariachi 
Math Club
Mock Trial
Momentum
National Honor Society
Orchestra
Pure Movement
FRC Robotics
Lego Robotics
ROTC
Scriptoria
Secular Student Alliance
Shield Yearbook
Silhouettes Dance Team
Social Studies Club
Speech & Debate
Student Council
Teen Volunteer Corps
Winter Color Guard
Young Scholars' Bowl

UIL Championships
Band, 1986 UIL Wind Ensemble State Champion
Girls Wrestling, 2014, 2015, 2016, 2017, 2018 and 2019 (6 straight State Championships)
Boys Golf, 1995

Notable alumni
Ara Celi, Actress
Mark Grudzielanek, Professional Baseball Player
Ginger Kerrick, American physicist and first Hispanic female NASA Flight Director at NASA's Lyndon B. Johnson Space Center
Bruce Ruffin, Major League Baseball Pitcher
Ryan Stout, Comedian
Ryan Piers Williams, Filmmaker
Alan Zinter, Professional Baseball Player
Gigi Causey, Production manager, Oscar nominee for best short film
Danny Perez, Professional Baseball Player
John Sosa, Professional Gold Player

References

External links
 
 YISD
 Shield Yearbook

Ysleta Independent School District high schools
High schools in El Paso, Texas